Imeni M. I. Kalinina is an urban locality (an urban-type settlement) in Vetluzhsky District of Nizhny Novgorod Oblast, Russia. Population:

References

Urban-type settlements in Nizhny Novgorod Oblast
Vetluzhsky District